Aeson or Aison, also Aesonis or Aisonis (Αἰσώνίς), was a town of Magnesia in ancient Thessaly, the name of which is derived from Aeson, the father of Jason.

References

Populated places in ancient Thessaly
Former populated places in Greece
Ancient Magnesia